Andreas Polykarpos Timonis, also referred under the italianized form Andrea Policarpo Timoni (14 March 1833, in Chios – July 25, 1904) was Roman Catholic Bishop of Chios from 30 July 1875 to 13 May 1879 and Archbishop of Izmir from then until his death in 1904.

References

External links
 http://www.catholic-hierarchy.org/bishop/btimoni.html 

1833 births
1904 deaths
19th-century Roman Catholic bishops in Greece
19th-century Roman Catholic archbishops in the Ottoman Empire
Roman Catholic bishops of Chios
Ottoman İzmir/Smyrna
Clergy from Chios